Thomas McKean was an American lawyer and politician.

Thomas McKean may also refer to:
Thomas J. McKean (1810–1870), American engineer, soldier and politician
Thomas A. McKean (born 1965), American autistic author and lecturer